Yucca de Lac was a high-end restaurant in Hong Kong, famous for frequently serving as a scene for the black-and-white Cantonese films made in the 1960s. Located at Tai Po Road, Ma Liu Shui, near the Chinese University of Hong Kong, it was opened in 1963 and closed on September 20, 2005. 

The scene of a man and woman enjoying afternoon tea under a parasol in the restaurant is part of the collective memory of many Hong Kongers. 

The restaurant's name is derived from "yucca", a species of evergreen plant, and de Lac meaning by the lake in French.

USA branch
On March 26, 2012 the Fung Lum Restaurant Group opened a USA branch of the Yucca de lac bar and restaurant in the Stanford Shopping Center in Palo Alto, California.

Demolition and redevelopment

The site of the restaurant was sold in 2005 to a local businessman at $380 million HKD for redevelopment as a real estate project. There were concerns from environmental groups that woodland on the site would not be preserved. Including the price of the land, developer Yucca Development invested over $1 billion in the 21-home project.

See also
 Hong Kong tea culture

References

External links

 Yucca de lac USA restaurant official website

Ma Liu Shui
Restaurants in Hong Kong
Defunct restaurants
Restaurants established in 1963
Restaurants disestablished in 2005
Former buildings and structures in Hong Kong
1963 establishments in Hong Kong
2005 disestablishments in Hong Kong